The Tooheys Challenge Cup (subsequently known by various other sponsors' names including the Channel Ten Challenge Cup, Lotto Challenge Cup and Tooheys Challenge Cup) was a Pre-season knockout rugby league competition run by the New South Wales Rugby League held in Australia between 1978 and 1995. The format was a straight knock-out. It aired on Channel Ten from 1978-1991, and the Nine Network from 1992-1995.

History 
The competition ran over seven editions, in 1978 and from 1990 until 1995. During that second period, the competition was the top cup rugby league competition after the Amco Cup was dissolved the year before.

Host cities over the course of the competition included Sydney, Brisbane, Gold Coast, Lismore, Wagga Wagga, Albury, Dubbo, Broken Hill, Gunnedah, Parkes, Narrandera, Tamworth, Port Macquarie, Orange, West Wyalong, Cobar, Bega, Inverell, Coffs Harbour, Armidale, Bathurst, Ballina, Nambucca Heads, Bundaberg, Toowoomba, Alice Springs, Wellington and Auckland.

Challenge Cup winners

See also

Amco Cup
Pre-season Cup
NSW Challenge Cup

References

External links

1978 establishments in Australia
Recurring sporting events established in 1978
Defunct rugby league competitions in Australia
National cup competitions
10 Sport